Svetlana Yevgenyevna Feofanova (born 16 July 1980) is a Russian pole vaulter.

Svetlana Feofanova was born in Moscow, Soviet Union. She has studied at the Finance University under the Government of the Russian Federation. Feofanova was a gymnast in her youth but did not continue competing in the sport.

In the World Athletics Championships, she was the second in 2001 and the first in 2003. She won also the World Indoor Championships in 2003, and she was the third in 2004. She finished fourth at the 2006 European Athletics Championships in Gothenburg, Sweden. On 4 July 2004 she pole vaulted  in Heraklion, Greece, which was a world record at the time.

She won the silver medal in women's pole vaulting at the 2004 Summer Olympics (behind compatriot Yelena Isinbayeva). She won the bronze in the 2008 Summer Olympics.

Personal bests
Pole Vault (outdoors) = , July 2004 — tenth on the all-time list
Pole Vault (indoors) = , February 2004 — ninth on the indoor all-time list

National titles
6 times Russian National Outdoor Pole Vault Champion: 2001, '06, '07, '08, '11, '12
4 times Russian National Indoor Pole Vault Champion: 2001, '06, '08, '10

International competitions

NM = No Mark (no-height)
At both the 2000 and 2012 Olympics, Feofanova went out of the qualifying competition without clearing a height.

See also
List of Olympic medalists in athletics (women)
List of 2004 Summer Olympics medal winners
List of 2008 Summer Olympics medal winners
List of World Athletics Championships medalists (women)
List of IAAF World Indoor Championships medalists (women)
List of European Athletics Championships medalists (women)
List of European Athletics Indoor Championships medalists (women)
List of pole vault national champions (women)
List of people from Moscow
Pole vault at the Olympics

References

Svetlana Feofanova at trackfield.brinkster.net

1980 births
Living people
Athletes from Moscow
Russian female pole vaulters
Olympic female pole vaulters
Olympic athletes of Russia
Olympic silver medalists for Russia
Olympic bronze medalists for Russia
Olympic silver medalists in athletics (track and field)
Olympic bronze medalists in athletics (track and field)
Athletes (track and field) at the 2000 Summer Olympics
Athletes (track and field) at the 2004 Summer Olympics
Athletes (track and field) at the 2008 Summer Olympics
Athletes (track and field) at the 2012 Summer Olympics
Medalists at the 2004 Summer Olympics
Medalists at the 2008 Summer Olympics
Goodwill Games medalists in athletics
Competitors at the 2001 Goodwill Games
World Athletics Championships athletes for Russia
World Athletics Championships medalists
World Athletics Championships winners
World Athletics Indoor Championships winners
IAAF Continental Cup winners
European Athletics Championships winners
European Athletics Championships medalists
European Athletics Indoor Championships winners
Russian Athletics Championships winners
Financial University under the Government of the Russian Federation alumni
20th-century Russian women
21st-century Russian women